Lorne Hyman Greene  (born Lyon Himan Green; 12 February 1915 – 11 September 1987) was a Canadian actor, musician, singer and radio personality. His notable television roles include Ben Cartwright on the Western Bonanza and Commander Adama in the original science-fiction television series Battlestar Galactica and Galactica 1980.  He also worked on the Canadian television nature documentary series Lorne Greene's New Wilderness and in television commercials.

Early life and career in Canada

Greene was born Lyon Himan Green in Ottawa, Ontario, to Jewish immigrants from the Russian Empire, Dora (née Grinovsky) and Daniel Green, a shoemaker. He was called "Chaim" by his mother, and his name is shown as "Hyman" on his school report cards. In a biography of him, written by his daughter Linda Greene Bennett, she wrote that it was unknown when he began using the name Lorne, nor when he added an "e" to Green. 

Greene was the drama instructor at Camp Arowhon, a summer camp in Algonquin Park, Ontario, Canada, where he developed his talents.

Greene began acting while attending Queen's University in Kingston, where he acquired a knack for broadcasting with the Radio Workshop of the university's Drama Guild on the campus radio station CFRC. 

He gave up on a career in chemical engineering, and upon graduation, found a job as a radio broadcaster for the Canadian Broadcasting Corporation (CBC).  

During World War II, Greene served as a Flying officer in the Royal Canadian Air Force. 

Afterward, he was assigned as the principal newsreader on the CBC National News. The CBC gave him the nickname "The Voice of Canada", although his role in delivering distressing war news in sonorous tones with his deep, resonant voice following Canada's entry into World War II in 1939 caused many listeners to call him "The Voice of Doom", instead, particularly since he was delegated the assignment of reading the dreaded list of soldiers killed in the war. 

During his radio days, Greene invented a stopwatch which ran backwards (i.e. it would start from a given number and count down to zero); this helped radio announcers gauge how much time was left while speaking.

During his CBC radio career, Greene also narrated documentary films, such as the National Film Board of Canada's Fighting Norway (1943).

Greene left the CBC and became a freelancer after the war when the network ordered staff announcers to turn over a large percentage of any income they earned from film narration. Greene continued to appear on CBC on a freelance basis while becoming the newsreader for private radio station CKEY in Toronto, while also returning to acting work both on stage and in radio plays.

After closing his Academy of Radio Arts in 1952, Greene relocated to the United States. Katharine Cornell cast him twice in her Broadway productions. In 1953, he was cast in The Prescott Proposals. In that same year, she cast him in a verse drama by Christopher Fry, The Dark is Light Enough. Greene likewise began appearing in isolated episodes on live television in the 1950s. In 1953, he was seen in the title role of a one-hour adaptation of Shakespeare's Othello. In 1954, he made his Hollywood debut as Saint Peter in The Silver Chalice and made several more films and appearances on American television. In 1955, he starred in the British Canadian TV series Sailor of Fortune. In 1955, he was Ludwig van Beethoven in an episode of the TV version of You Are There, and also appeared as Marcus Brutus in Julius Caesar at the Stratford Festival. In 1957, Greene played the prosecutor in Peyton Place.

American television

The first of his continuing TV roles was as the patriarch Ben "Pa" Cartwright in Bonanza, the first one-hour Western series filmed in colour (1959–1973), making Greene a household name. He garnered the role after his performance as O'Brien in the CBS production of Nineteen Eighty-Four.

In the 1960s, Greene capitalized on his image as Ben Cartwright by recording several albums of country-western/folk songs, which Greene performed in a mixture of spoken word and singing. In 1964, Greene had a number-one single on the music charts with his spoken-word ballad, "Ringo" (which referred to the real-life Old West outlaw Johnny Ringo), and got  play time from "Saga of the Ponderosa", which detailed the Cartwright founding of the famous ranch.

In 1973, after the cancellation of Bonanza following a 14-year run, Greene joined Ben Murphy in the ABC crime drama, Griff, about a Los Angeles, California, police officer, Wade "Griff" Griffin, who retires to become a private detective. When it failed to gain sufficient ratings and was cancelled after 13 episodes, Greene thereafter hosted the syndicated nature documentary series Last of the Wild from 1974 to 1975.

In the 1977 miniseries Roots, he played the first master of Kunta Kinte, John Reynolds. Through the 1970s, Greene was the spokesman for Alpo Beef Chunks dog food commercials, one of the possible origins of the phrase "Eating your own dog food". 

In 2007, TV Guide listed Ben Cartwright as the nation's second-most popular TV father (behind Cliff Huxtable). Greene was also known for his role as Commander Adama, another patriarchal figure, in the science-fiction television series Battlestar Galactica (1978–1979) and Galactica 1980 (1980).  Greene's typecasting as a wise father character continued with the 1981 series Code Red as a fire-department chief, whose command includes his children as subordinates. Greene appeared with his former Bonanza co-star Michael Landon on an episode of Highway to Heaven. Greene also appeared with his former Bonanza co-star Pernell Roberts on a two-part episode of Vega$.

He appeared in the HBO mockumentary The Canadian Conspiracy, about the supposed subversion of the United States by Canadian-born media personalities. For nearly a decade, Greene co-hosted the Macy's Thanksgiving Day Parade on NBC with Betty White.

Back on Canadian television

In the 1980s, Greene devoted his energies to wildlife and environmental issues, including hosting and narrating the CTV's nature series Lorne Greene's New Wilderness, a show which promoted environmental awareness.

Personal life

Greene was married twice, first to Rita Hands of Toronto (19381960, divorced). Some reports list the start of their marriage as 1940. They had two children, twins born in 1945: Charles and Belinda Susan. His second wife was Nancy Deale (19611987, Greene's death), with whom he had one child, Gillian Dania Greene, who is married to director Sam Raimi. 

The Ponderosa II House was built by Greene in 1960 in Mesa, Arizona. It is located at 602 S. Edgewater Drive. It is a replica of the Bonanza set house from the former Ponderosa Ranch in Incline Village, Nevada. It is listed in the Mesa Historic Property Register.

Death
Greene died on 11 September 1987, aged 72, from complications from pneumonia, following ulcer surgery, in Santa Monica, California. He was interred at Hillside Memorial Park Cemetery in Culver City.

Honours and awards
Greene was made an Officer of the Order of Canada on 28 October 1969, "for services to the Performing Arts and to the community."

Greene was awarded an honorary doctor of laws degree by his alma mater, Queen's University, in 1971. He was the 1987 recipient of the Earle Grey Award for Lifetime Achievement at the Canadian Gemini Awards. He has a star on the Hollywood Walk of Fame at 1559 N. Vine Street.

In 1974, Greene received the Golden Plate Award of the American Academy of Achievement.

In February 1985, Greene was the Krewe of Bacchus King of Mardi Gras.

In May 2006, Greene became one of the first of four entertainers to ever be honoured by Canada Post by being featured on a 51-cent postage stamp.

Greene was inducted into Canada's Walk of Fame, found on King Street and Simcoe Street in Toronto, in 2015.

Lorne Greene Academy of Radio Arts
Greene founded and was dean of the Lorne Greene Academy of Radio Arts in Toronto in 1945, which trained a number of future broadcasters and actors including Leslie Nielsen, James Doohan, Les Rubie, Gordie Tapp, Fred Davis, Billie Mae Richards, William Davidson, Alfie Scopp, Murray Chercover, Cec Linder, Les Lye, and Bill Luxton , Roy Currie. The school was located on Jarvis Street across from what was then the CBC Radio building. Its faculty included many CBC staff such as Mavor Moore, Fletcher Markle, Lister Sinclair, Andrew Allan, and Esse Ljungh, and graduated a total of 381 students in seven years, 90% of whom found work in the industry. Though successful academically, the school continually lost money, resulting in Greene closing the school in 1952, allowing him to sell the building to recoup his losses.

Filmography

 Churchill's Island (1941) as narrator
 Warclouds in the Pacific (1941) as narrator
 Inside Fighting China (1941) as narrator
 Flight 6 (1944) as narrator
 Othello (1953) (television) as Othello
 1984 (short film, 1953) as O'Brien
 The Philip Morris Playhouse (one episode, 1953) as Joe
 Omnibus (one episode, 1953) as Ed Bailey
 Danger (one episode, 1954) as Stranger
 The Silver Chalice (1954) as Saint Peter
 Justice (one episode, 1954, "The Desperate One")
 You Are There (three episodes, 1954–1955) as Ludwig van Beethoven / Charles Stewart Parnell
 Tight Spot (1955) as Benjamin Costain
 Climax! (one episode, 1955) as Dr. Charles Saunders
 The Elgin Hour (one episode, 1955) as Vernon Dyall
 Studio 57 (one episode, 1955) as Gentry Morton
 Alfred Hitchcock Presents (one episode, 1956) as Mr. X
 Autumn Leaves (1956) as Mr. Hanson
 The Alcoa Hour (one episode, 1956) as Sheriff Gash
 Armstrong Circle Theatre (one episode, 1956) as Angelina
 The United States Steel Hour (one episode, 1956) as Dallas
 Kraft Television Theatre (one episode, 1957) as Colonel Matthews
 Playhouse 90 (one episode, 1957) as Lowell Williams
 Studio One (five episodes, 1953–1957)
 Peyton Place (1957) as Prosecutor
 The Hard Man (1957) as Rice Martin
 The Gift of Love (1958) as Grant Allan
 Suspicion (one episode, 1958) as Monty
 The Last of the Fast Guns (1958) as Michael O'Reilly
 Shirley Temple's Storybook (one episode, 1958) as King Bertrand
 The Buccaneer (1958) as Mercier
 The Trap (1959) as Davis
 Bonanza (417 episodes, 1959–1973) as Ben Cartwright
 The Third Man (one episode, 1959)
 The Gale Storm Show (one episode, 1959) as Constable Barnaby
 The Hangman (1959) as Marshal Clum Cummings
 Mike Hammer (two episodes, 1959) as Carl Kunard, Emmett Gates
 Bronco (one episode, 1959) as Capt. Amos Carr
 Wagon Train (one episode, 1959) as Christopher Webb
 Cheyenne (two episodes, 1960) as Colonel Bell
 The Errand Boy (1961) as Ben Cartwright – Cameo (uncredited)
 The Legend of Amaluk: An Arctic Odyssey (1972) as narrator
 Griff (12 episodes, 1973–1974) as Wade Griffin
 Earthquake (1974) as Sam Royce
 Tidal Wave (1973) as Ambassador Warren Richards (1975 US Version only)
 Nevada Smith (1975) as Jonas Cord
 The Moneychangers (1976) as George Quartermain
 Roots (two episodes, 1977) as John Reynolds
 SST: Death Flight (1977) as Marshall Cole
 The Hardy Boys/Nancy Drew Mysteries (two episodes, 1977) as Inspector Hans Stavlin
 The Trial of Lee Harvey Oswald (1977) as Matthew Arnold Watson
 Yabba Dabba Doo! The Happy World of Hanna-Barbera (1977) as Special Guest
 Happy Days (1977) as Special Guest Cameo
 The Bastard (1978) as Bishop Francis
 Battlestar Galactica (21 episodes, 1978–1979) as Commander Adama
 The Love Boat (three episodes, 1979–1982) as Buck Hamilton / Buddy Bowers
 Klondike Fever (1980) as Sam Steele
 Galactica 1980 (10 episodes, 1980) as Commander Adama
 Living Legend: The King of Rock and Roll (1980)
 Pink Lady (one episode, 1980) as himself
 Vega$ (two episodes, 1980) as Emil Remick
 A Time for Miracles (1980) as Bishop John Carroll
 Aloha Paradise (one episode, 1981) as Businessman
 The Wizard of Oz (1982) as The Wizard (voice)
 Code Red (12 episodes, 1981–1982) as Battalion Chief Joe Rorchek
 Police Squad! (one episode, 1982) as Stabbed Man
 Heidi's Song (1982) as Grandfather (voice)
 Lorne Greene's New Wilderness (104 episodes, 1982–1987) as Host / Narrator
 The Nutcracker: A Fantasy on Ice (1983) as himself / narrator
 Highway to Heaven (one episode, 1985) as Fred Fusco
 The Greatest Adventure: Stories from the Bible (1986) as Noah (voice)
 Vasectomy: A Delicate Matter (1986) as Theo Marshall
 The Alamo: Thirteen Days to Glory (1987) as General Sam Houston (final film role)

Discography

Albums

Singles

See also

 Canadian pioneers in early Hollywood
 Western (genre)

References

External links
Canadian Communications Foundation: Lorne Greene (1915–1987)
 
 
 
 Entry at thecanadianencyclopedia.ca
 

1915 births
1987 deaths
20th-century Canadian male actors
Burials at Hillside Memorial Park Cemetery
Canadian Broadcasting Corporation people
Canadian country singers
Canadian expatriate male actors in the United States
Canadian male film actors
Canadian male journalists
Canadian male television actors
Canadian male voice actors
Canadian people of Russian-Jewish descent
Canadian radio news anchors
Canadian radio personalities
CBC Radio hosts
Deaths from pneumonia in California
Jewish Canadian journalists
Jewish Canadian male actors
Jewish singers
Male actors from Ottawa
Musicians from Ottawa
Officers of the Order of Canada
Queen's University at Kingston alumni
RCA Victor artists
Royal Canadian Air Force officers
Royal Canadian Air Force personnel of World War II